Leonardo Robert Fayão or simply Alemão (born May 5, 1986 in Ribeirão Preto), is a Brazilian central defender.

Contract
11 November 2005 to 31 July 2007

External links
 CBF

1986 births
Living people
Brazilian footballers
Sport Club Corinthians Paulista players
Association football defenders
People from Ribeirão Preto
Footballers from São Paulo (state)